Herbert Henry Royer (June 4, 1915 – April 7, 2003) was an American football coach. He served as was the head football coach at West Virginia University Institute of Technology from 1949 to 1950 and at Marshall University from 1953 to 1958, compiling a career college football head coaching record of 35–34–4.

A native of Loveland, Ohio, Royer lived in Newark, Ohio during his early childhood and then moved to Dunbar, West Virginia, where he completed high school. He attended Emory and Henry College and then Marshall, where played football as a halfback from 1935 to 1937 under head coach Cam Henderson. After graduating from Marshall in 1938, Royer signed with the Detroit Lions of the National Football League (NFL), but ultimately declined to play professional football.

Royer served in the United States Navy during World War II.

Head coaching record

College football

References

1915 births
2003 deaths
American football halfbacks
Marshall Thundering Herd football coaches
Marshall Thundering Herd football players
Virginia Tech Hokies football coaches
West Virginia Tech Golden Bears football coaches
High school basketball coaches in West Virginia
High school football coaches in West Virginia
United States Navy personnel of World War II
Emory and Henry College alumni
People from Dunbar, West Virginia
People from Loveland, Ohio
Sportspeople from Newark, Ohio
Coaches of American football from West Virginia
Players of American football from West Virginia
Basketball coaches from West Virginia
Military personnel from West Virginia